Idaho Legislative District 19 is one of 35 districts of the Idaho Legislature. It is currently represented by Cherie Buckner-Webb, Democrat of Boise, Lauren Necochea, Democrat of Boise, and Melissa Wintrow, Democrat of Boise.

District profile (2012–present) 
District 19 currently consists of a portion of Ada County.

District profile (2002–2012) 
From 2002 to 2012, District 19 consisted of a portion of Ada County.

District profile (1992–2002) 
From 1992 to 2002, District 17 consisted of a portion of Ada County.

See also

 List of Idaho Senators
 List of Idaho State Representatives

References

External links

Idaho Legislative District Map (with members)
Idaho Legislature (official site)

19
Ada County, Idaho